FashionTV is an international fashion and lifestyle broadcasting television channel. Founded in France in 1997, by its Polish-born president Michel Adam Lisowski, FashionTV is a widely distributed satellite channels in the world with 31 satellite and 2,000 cable systems. As of 2014, it had 400 million views all over the world.

FashionTV is a multi-media platform offering a review of global fashion and is independently owned and operated from the headquarters in Paris, London and Vienna.

Other Regions

South Africa
In South Africa, FashionTV has been available on DStv, channel 178 and on the newly launched TopTV. In early 2016, DStv put up an "important notice" on channel 178, announcing that FashionTV would stop airing on February 28, 2016.

Fashion TV Channel
 FTV EU
 FTV America
 FTV Affirm
 FTV Africa
 FTV Australia
 FTV Japan
 FTV Russia
 FTV Brazil
 FTV Singapore
 FTV Korea
 FTV Central Asia
 FTV Canada

Latin America
Was available in the period 1998 until 2011, when Turner Broadcasting replace the channel because finished the contract.

Australia
In Australia, the channel was available on the Foxtel Digital Subscription Television and Austar channel 123 and the MidnightHot programme was sometimes seen on channel 955. As of February 26, 2012, Foxtel and Austar no longer offer FashionTV, however it will still be offered by IPTV service FetchTV. It was originally reported that dropping the channel was due to it being liquidated, but the original franchisee (FTV Oceania Pty. Ltd) was liquidated in July 2011 and FashionTV International took back control of all the activities in Australia then, so the reason the channel was dropped from Foxtel and Austar is unknown.

Asia
In Asia, the channel is seen live via satellite, free-to-air on AsiaSat 3s. It is seen all over Asia in Sri Lanka, Nepal, Vietnam, Singapore, Hong Kong, Japan, Indonesia, Malaysia, Philippines, South Korea, Taiwan, Thailand and Mongolia.

In Hong Kong, the channel is available on all direct broadcast satellite service providers and all cable television operators. It is available in Bangladesh via the Bongo video-on-demand service since June 2022.

Belgium
In Belgium the channel is available on Proximus TV, Telenet, and VOO via IPTV & cable and via Satellite DVB-S on the Astra 19.2° East

Brazil
Released with August 6, 2007, Fashion TV Brasil by Turner Broadcasting, in 2011 the company terminated the contract with its owner, giving rise to Glitz. The company Box Brazil TV relaunched the channel in September 2012. This channel is available in all major TV operators: Oi, Vivo, Claro, Sky and NEOTV Associated Operators.

Czech Republic & Slovakia
In Czech Republic and Slovakia, the channel is available on the UPC, O2TV, Orange, Magio T-Systems, RioMedia, Slovanet etc.

India
In 2007, FTV was suspended from broadcasting in India for two months for showing scantily-clad models on its show Midnight Hot. The channel was suspended again in 2010 for 10 days for airing a show containing topless models associated with the Bella Club TV show.

FTV is currently available on Airtel digital TV and through some of the local Cable TV service providers. 

FTV India, owned Modi Entertainment Networks (MEN) - a joint venture between Lalit Modi and Walt Disney, had entered into an agreement with Programmgesellschaft mbH,  the parent company of the fTV brand in August 2001 for broadcast rights in India and for franchising fBars, the channel's branded nightclubs. FTV India was to pay a minimum annual guarantee of $720,000 per annum and the channel would only be available on pay television to Indian viewers. However, in 2003, FTV India went free-to-air, triggering the dispute over revenue sharing and outstanding payments. On 24 May 2011 the Delhi high court restrained fTV from terminating the agreement. This injunction was later removed by an arbitral tribunal. On 4 January 2012, the case was heard by the Supreme Court of India.

Italy
In Italy, FashionTV UHD is available on channel 289 tivùsat, 489 SKY HD and free-to-air channel on satellite Hot Bird at 13°E.

Israel
In Israel, FTV (ערוץ האופנה) is available on HOT channel 184, on yes channel 67, on Partner TV channel 47, and on Cellcom TV.

Middle East & North Africa
FashionTV Europe HD is broadcasting Pay TV, On OSN Network Channel 225.

New Zealand
In New Zealand, FashionTV was available on Freeview (New Zealand) DTT channel 30. The channel was previously on Sky Network Television channel 066. In November 2004, FashionTV was dropped from Sky Network Television due to a dispute over FashionTV wanting subscriber revenue. This dispute was settled in early 2005, with the channel relaunching on April 18. On May 11, 2011, FashionTV was once again dropped from Sky.

North America
It is now available on wireless television providers MobiTV and Sprint TV; However, FashionTV is not available on any cable or satellite television service in North America as of August 2011. It has also been removed from FTA (Free To Air) as of September 2011. FashionTV can be watched live in North America only on their website.

Portugal
In Portugal, FashionTV is available on AR Telecom, Bragatel (channel 45), Meo (channel 101), TVTel (channel 54) and ZON TVCabo (channel 73).

Philippines
In the Philippines, the channel has been available on SkyCable on Channel 108, Cablelink Channel 66 since January 28, 2008, and selected cable affiliate channels. Some selected cities and provinces used two feeds, FashionTV Asia over AsiaSat 3 and FashionTV India & SE Asia over Thaicom 5 feeds including FashionTV HD.

Russia
In Russia, the channel began broadcasting in 2001.

Serbia / Southeastern Europe
Serbian version of FashionTV called FashionTV SEE (FashionTV South East Europe) was launched on 24 November 2008. It is also broadcast in Slovenia, Croatia, Bulgaria, Bosnia and Herzegovina, Montenegro and North Macedonia via their local cable TV providers and DTH platforms. 30% of production is made by local production.

Thailand
FashionTV Thailand was recently broadcasting free-to-air from THAICOM 5 at 78.5°east. The same satellite where FashionTV India was located in the same signal and broadcast. However, the channel was immediately off the air. Thailand viewers can still watch in the presence of both FashionTV Asia and India Feed.

Turkey
FashionTV is available on Digiturk Channel 110 (HD Channel 394).

Other FashionTV channels

FashionTV UHD

In September 2015, FashionTV launched a new UHD 4K channel. It can be received in Asia, Australia, India, Europe Hot Bird at 13°E, North America, Middle East and Africa.

Defunct channels

Latin America

FashionTV started their Latin American version, FashionTV Latin America, FashionTV Brasil, in late 2001, in association with Claxson, and in late 2006 it was acquired by Time Warner-owned Turner Broadcasting. The Latin American version was their oldest overseas channel. These channels aired a significant amount of original programming, as well as acquired programming such as The Fashion Show, Running in Heels and Iconoclasts. After the license agreement to use the "FashionTV" brand ended, the channel was replaced on May 1, 2011, with Glitz*, which retained most of the FTVLA/FTVBR programming. The company BoxBrazil TV relaunched the Fashion TV in Brazil in September 2012.

References

External links

FTV Italia

Foreign television channels broadcasting in the United Kingdom
Fashion journalism
Fashion-themed television series
Fashion industry
Television channels and stations established in 1997
Television channels in North Macedonia
Fashion-related television channels